is a Japanese professional sumo wrestler from Tatsugō, Kagoshima. After a successful amateur career, he turned professional in January 2016, making the top makuuchi division in November of the following year. His highest rank has been maegashira 11. He wrestles for Oitekaze stable.

Early life and sumo background
He started sumo in his second year of elementary school, eventually in high school he would go on to win Kanazawa high school sumo tournament helping him to join the prestigious Nihon University sumo program which he would later be Captain. He injured his Medial meniscus in his third year having to undergo corrective surgery to fix. After graduating he became a business association player after finding employment at Nihon University as a staff member. After winning the 2015 Japan Corporate Sumo Tournament one of the four tournaments that grants tsukedashi, he decided to join Oitekaze stable under fellow Nihon University graduate Daishōyama.

Career 
He made his debut in January, 2016. Because of his amateur success he was granted a makushita tsukedashi allowing him to skip the lower divisions of sumo. He quickly rose up the ranks recording only one make-koshi or losing record on the way to the makuuchi division. He won the jūryō division yūshō or championship in July 2017 and followed up with another kachi-koshi or winning record in September. He made his makuuchi debut in November 2017 at the rank of maegashira 14. After a 6–9 record he produced kachi-koshi or winning records in his second and third top division tournaments, and was promoted to his highest rank to date of maegashira 11 in May. However he scored only 4–11 in this tournament and was demoted back to jūryō. He returned to makuuchi after the September 2018 tournament where he scored 11–4, losing a playoff for the championship to Tokushōryū. He was unable to get winning records in the November 2018 and January 2019 tournaments and was demoted to jūryō again. He returned to makuuchi in March 2020 following an 11-4 record in the previous tournament, but could only score 5–10 and was again demoted. He returned to the top division a year later in March 2021, and managed to remain in makuuchi for three straight tournaments, but fell back to jūryō in September 2021. In May 2022 he took part in a playoff for the jūryō championship after an 11–4 record, but he was defeated by Nishikifuji.

Fighting style
Daimami is a yotsu-sumo wrestler who prefers grappling techniques to pushing or thrusting. His favoured grip on his opponent's mawashi is migi-yotsu, a left hand outside, right hand inside position. His most common winning kimarite is a straightforward yori-kiri, or push out.

Career record

See also
List of sumo tournament second division champions
Glossary of sumo terms
List of active sumo wrestlers

References

External links 

Sumo people from Kagoshima Prefecture
1992 births
Living people
Nihon University alumni
Japanese sumo wrestlers